Areley Kings is a Worcestershire village on the River Severn 10 miles north of Worcester in the picturesque area of the Wyre Forest. The area is featured in the Domesday Book and many historical places of interest, like Areley Hall, are open to visitors. Nearby Stourport-on-Severn grew during the Victorian era and is still very popular with tourists and holiday makers all year round for canal and river cruising and for the many well signed walks through some of the finest Worcestershire countryside.

History

The manor of Areley Kings was from early times part of the manor of Martley and the rector of Martley still has the right to appoint the rector at Areley Kings.  The manor of Areley originated in a fishery at "Ernel" which, with the land belonging to it, was granted by the Empress Matilda to Bordesley Abbey upon its foundation in 1136, and retained until the Dissolution.

Prince Rupert of the Rhine is rumoured to have slept a night at Areley House during the English Civil War.

Areley Kings was in the upper division of Doddingtree Hundred.

Church

St Bartholomew's Parish Church at Areley Kings was founded as a Norman Church, with a continuous history and a partial re-building by the Victorians. The church is probably first mentioned in the preface of the Brut of Laȝamon, who wrote sometime between 1189 and 1207.  He describes himself as a priest at Erneleye, at a noble church upon Severn's bank. He wrote a history of England, partly legendary, partly factual, translating earlier writings from Latin and French.  The discovery, during rebuilding, of the base of a Norman font under the nave floor with an inscription containing the name of Layamon, establishes the connection with the writer and shows that a church existed here c. 1200.

The church complex includes a Queen Anne Rectory and medieval timber-framed church house.

Notable people
 Charles Harrison, MP  for Bewdley from 1874 to 1890 lived at Areley Court, Areley Kings.
 Frances Ridley Havergal wrote the hymn Take my life and let it be at Areley House in 1874.
 Layamon 12/13th century poet lived in Areley Kings and a local road is named after him.

References

Populated places on the River Severn
Villages in Worcestershire
Stourport-on-Severn